Here is the list of regencies and city in Bali. As of June 2022, there are 8 regencies and 1 city.

Reference 

Bali
Lists of subdivisions of Indonesia
Indonesia geography-related lists